Brocchia is a genus of flowering plants belonging to the family Asteraceae. It contains a single species, Brocchia cinerea.

Its native range is Sahara and Sahel to Jordan, Arabian Peninsula, Comoros.

References

Anthemideae
Monotypic Asteraceae genera